The Belgian Football League (BFL) is the amateur sports league for American football in Belgium. The league currently consists of 18 teams from Belgian cities and regions and one team from Luxembourg. The league is divided into two conferences—the Flemish American Football League (FAFL) and Ligue Francophone de Football Americain de Belgique (LFFAB). At the end of each regular season, three teams from each conference play in the BFL playoffs, a six-team single-elimination tournament that culminates with the championship game, known as the Belgian Bowl.

Historical results are summarized below.

1987-1994

1995-1999

2000 

2000 Playoffs

2001 

2001 Playoffs

2002 

2002 Playoffs

2003

2004 

2004 Playoffs

2005 

 - clinched seed to the playoffs

2005 Playoffs

2006 

2006 Playoffs

2007 

2007 Playoffs

2008 

2008 Playoffs

2009 

2009 Playoffs

2010 

2010 Playoffs

2011 

2011 Playoffs

2012 

2012 Playoffs

2013 

2013 Playoffs

2014 

2014 Playoffs

2015 

2015 Playoffs

Statistics

Overview Championship of Belgium and Belgian Bowl

BFL standings since 2000

 † indicates a defunct team
 Statistics for the 2001 division II not included
 Teams in yellow currently play in the FFL, in red in the LFFAB.

References

External links
Official BFL website
Historical BAFL scores

American football in Belgium